The 76-mm divisional gun M1933 was a Soviet divisional field gun, which was adopted in limited numbers by the Red Army in 1933.

Description
The M1933 was a transitional type between the modernized 76 mm divisional gun M1902/30 and the 76 mm divisional gun M1936 (F-22).  It followed an established pattern of mating a new gun barrel with an existing carriage from the 122 mm howitzer M1910/30. The gun was equipped with a box trail, unsprung spoked wheels, gun shield, hydro-pneumatic recoil system and was chambered in the standard 76.2 × 385mm R.  Despite being considered a stopgap until the adoption of the M1936, some were still on hand during the opening phases of World War II.  The German designation for the gun was 7.62 cm FK 298(r), but it is not known if the Germans used the type.

Photo Gallery

References

World War II field artillery
76 mm artillery
World War II artillery of the Soviet Union